Christ Church, at Zero Garden Street in Cambridge, Massachusetts, U.S., is a parish of the Episcopal Diocese of Massachusetts. Built in 1760–61, it was designated a National Historic Landmark as one of the few buildings unambiguously attributable to Peter Harrison, the first formally trained architect to work in the British colonies.

History
The congregation was founded in 1759 by members of the King's Chapel who lived in Cambridge to have a church closer to their homes and to provide Church of England services to students at Harvard College across Cambridge Common. The church's first rector was East Apthorp, and most of the founding members lived along the nearby Tory Row, now called Brattle Street.

The church was designed by noted colonial era architect Peter Harrison, who also designed the King's Chapel in Boston, and is one of a small number of surviving buildings attributable to him. It is built in Georgian style. Its wooden frame rests on a granite foundation built from ballast stones from ships arriving at Boston Harbor. The church was originally finished in a sanded paint treatment to give the appearance of a traditional English stone church.

During the American Revolution Christ Church was attacked by dissenting colonials for its Tory leanings, but it was also the site of a prayer service which George and Martha Washington attended while quartered in the nearby mansion now known as Longfellow House–Washington's Headquarters National Historic Site. The church was closed, and its organ melted down for bullets during the Revolution.

For several years after the American Revolution, the church stood empty. In the later years of the eighteenth century the church was re-opened as an Episcopal Church and has remained so. The original chapel was expanded in 1857 to accommodate a larger congregation and to help raise funds for the church by expanding pew rental income. The church was dramatically redecorated in 1883, but it was restored to its original simplicity in 1920.

Generations of Harvard students from Richard Henry Dana Jr., author of Two Years Before the Mast, to Teddy Roosevelt  (having taught Sunday School there for more than 3 years, the young Roosevelt, a Presbyterian, eventually departed after being told he could not continue unless he became an Episcopalian) have made Christ Church their parish home during their studies.

The church was declared a National Historic Landmark in 1960, and was listed on the National Register of Historic Places in 1966.

To the east adjacent to the church at the corner of Garden Street and Massachusetts Avenue is a separate historic landmark known as the Old Burying Ground, not affiliated with the chapel or any other church; it pre-dates the present church by over a century.

Christ Church has a long history of social activism, supporting the civil rights movement, the peace movement, and ministries of social justice. In April 1967 the Reverend Martin Luther King Jr. and Doctor Benjamin Spock were denied access to a building at Harvard University to hold a press conference denouncing the Vietnam War, but the Reverend Murray Kenney welcomed them to Christ Church; a plaque in the parish hall commemorates the event. Another activist to speak at Christ Church was Jesse Jackson, who spoke as part of a Martin Luther King Jr. celebration in 2004.

Gallery

See also

 National Register of Historic Places listings in Cambridge, Massachusetts
 List of National Historic Landmarks in Massachusetts

References

External links
 
 Christ Church Website
 Illus. by Winslow Homer of bells

National Historic Landmarks in Cambridge, Massachusetts
Episcopal church buildings in Massachusetts
Churches on the National Register of Historic Places in Massachusetts
Churches in Cambridge, Massachusetts
Harvard Square
18th-century Episcopal church buildings
Historic district contributing properties in Massachusetts
National Register of Historic Places in Cambridge, Massachusetts
Georgian architecture in Massachusetts